Robert Howard may refer to:

Entertainment
 Robert Howard (playwright) (1626–1698), English playwright and politician
 Robert Boardman Howard (1896–1983), American muralist and sculptor
 Robert E. Howard (1906–1936), fantasy writer, creator of  Conan the Barbarian
 Bob Howard (singer) (1906–1986), American jazz pianist and vocalist
 Robert Howard ("Dr. Robert", born 1961), British pop star and member of the Blow Monkeys

Politics
 Robert Howard (Royalist) (1585–1653), Royalist commander and M.P.
 Robert Danvers (1624–1674), aka Robert Howard, English politician
 Robert Howard, 2nd Earl of Wicklow (1757–1815), Anglo-Irish politician and peer
 Robert Howard (unionist) (1845–1902), British-born American labor union leader and politician
 Robert Mowbray Howard (1854–1928), English official 
 Rob Howard (politician) (fl. 2009), Canadian politician

Religion
 Robert Howard (bishop) (1670–1740), Anglican prelate in the Church of Ireland
 Robert Wilmot Howard (1887–1960), British Anglican priest and academic

Sports
 Robert Howard (martial artist) (born 1938), Irish taekwondo master
 Robert Howard (Irish swimmer) (born 1956), Irish Olympic swimmer
 Robert Howard (American swimmer) (born 1996), American freestyle swimmer
 Robert Howard (triple jumper) (1975–2004), American triple jumper
 Bob Howard (American football) (1944–2008), American football defensive back
 Bobby Howard (running back) (born 1964), American football running back
 Bob Howard (born 1963), American professional wrestler best known as Hardcore Holly
 Robert Howard (wrestler, born 2002)
 Rob Howard (footballer), English footballer

Other
 Robert Howard Hodgkin, British historian 
 Robert Howard (knight) (1385–1436), father of John Howard, 1st Duke of Norfolk
 Robert F. Howard (1883–1963), Texan farmer and agriculture professor
 Bob Howard (political scientist) (born 1936), Australian professor of international relations
 Robert Souper Howard (1818–1881), Chilean soldier
 Robert L. Howard (1939–2009), Medal of Honor recipient during the Vietnam War
 Robert Lesarian Howard, man convicted of murder
 Robert F. Howard (solar physicist), 2003 recipient of the George Ellery Hale Prize